The Citroën Technospace is a concept car designed by the French car manufacturer Citroën and announced at the 2013 Geneva Motor Show. 

It forms the basis of the second-generation Citroën C4 Picasso, and is the first model to use the new modular "Efficient Modular Platform 2" (EMP2) platform.

References

Technospace